Scrobipalpa albostriata is a moth in the family Gelechiidae. It was described by Povolný in 1977. It is found in northern Iran.

The forewings are blackish with a light brownish tinge and white stripes. The hindwings are grey.

References

Scrobipalpa
Moths described in 1977
Taxa named by Dalibor Povolný